In pottery, a potter's wheel is a machine used in the shaping (known as throwing) of clay into round ceramic ware. The wheel may also be used during the process of trimming excess clay from leather-hard dried ware that is stiff but malleable, and for applying incised decoration or rings of colour. Use of the potter's wheel became widespread throughout the Old World but was unknown in the Pre-Columbian New World, where pottery was handmade by methods that included coiling and beating.

A potter's wheel may occasionally be referred to as a "potter's lathe". However, that term is better used for another kind of machine that is used for a different shaping process, turning, similar to that used for shaping of metal and wooden articles. The pottery wheel is an important component to create arts and craft products. 

The techniques of jiggering and jolleying can be seen as extensions of the potter's wheel: in jiggering, a shaped tool is slowly brought down onto the plastic clay body that has been placed on top of the rotating plaster mould. The jigger tool shapes one face, the mould the other. The term is specific to the shaping of flat ware, such as plates, whilst a similar technique, jolleying, refers to the production of hollow ware, such as cups.

History 

Most early ceramic ware was hand-built using a simple coiling technique in which clay was rolled into long threads that were then pinched and smoothed together to form the body of a vessel. In the coiling method of construction, all the energy required to form the main part of a piece is supplied indirectly by the hands of the potter. Early ceramics built by coiling were often placed on mats or large leaves to allow them to be worked more conveniently. The evidence of this lies in mat or leaf impressions left in the clay of the base of the pot. This arrangement allowed the potter to rotate the vessel during construction, rather than walk around it to add coils of clay.

The oldest forms of the potter's wheel (called tourneys or slow wheels) were probably developed as an extension to this procedure. Tournettes, in use around 4500 BC in the Near East, were turned slowly by hand or by foot while coiling a pot. Only a small range of vessels were fashioned on the tournette, suggesting that it was used by a limited number of potters. The introduction of the slow wheel increased the efficiency of hand-powered pottery production.

In the mid to late 3rd millennium BC the fast wheel was developed, which operated on the flywheel principle. It utilised energy stored in the rotating mass of the heavy stone wheel itself to speed the process. This wheel was wound up and charged with energy by kicking, or pushing it around with a stick, providing angular momentum. The fast wheel enabled a new process of pottery-making to develop, called throwing, in which a lump of clay was placed centrally on the wheel and then squeezed, lifted and shaped as the wheel turned. The process tends to leave rings on the inside of the pot and can be used to create thinner-walled pieces and a wider variety of shapes, including stemmed vessels, so wheel-thrown pottery can be distinguished from handmade. Potters could now produce many more pots per hour, a first step towards industrialization. 
    

Many modern scholars suggest that the first potter's wheel was first developed by the ancient Sumerians in Mesopotamia. A stone potter's wheel found at the Sumerian city of Ur in modern-day Iraq has been dated to about 3129 BC, but fragments of wheel-thrown pottery of an even earlier date have been recovered in the same area. However, southeastern Europe and China have also been claimed as possible places of origin. Furthermore, the wheel was also in popular use by potters starting around 3500 BC in major cities of the Indus Valley civilization in South Asia, namely Harappa and Mohenjo-daro (Kenoyer, 2005). Others consider Egypt as "being the place of origin of the potter's wheel. It was here that the turntable shaft was lengthened about 3000 BC and a flywheel added. The flywheel was kicked and later was moved by pulling the edge with the left hand while forming the clay with the right. This led to the counterclockwise motion for the potter's wheel which is almost universal." Hence the exact origin of the wheel is not wholly clear yet.

This arrangement allowed the potter to keep the turning wheel rotating by kicking the flywheel with the foot, leaving both hands free for manipulating the vessel under construction. However, from an ergonomic standpoint, sweeping the foot from side to side against the spinning hub is rather awkward. At some point, an alternative solution was invented that involved a crankshaft with a lever that converted up-and-down motion into rotary motion.

The use of the motor-driven wheel has become common in modern times, particularly with craft potters and educational institutions, although human-powered ones are still in use and are preferred by some studio potters.

Techniques of throwing

Alternatively, by throwing and adding coils of clay then throwing again, pots up to four feet high may be made, the heat of a blowlamp being used to firm each thrown section before adding the next coil. In Chinese manufacturing, very large pots are made by two throwers working simultaneously.

The potter's wheel in myth and legend 
In Ancient Egyptian mythology, the deity Khnum was said to have formed the first humans on a potter's wheel.

References

External links 

Pottery (video on Internet Archive)
Earliest Depiction of a Kick-Wheel in Egypt
Isaac Button, Soil Hill Pottery near Halifax, England; Lakeside Pottery
The last Iranian woman potter using the ancient technique. Location: Pirtaj village in Chang-almas region in western Iran; Lakeside Pottery
Modern electric pottery wheels in Russia
Pottery Guides and it's Geological origins

Pottery